Carinhanha is a municipality in the state of Bahia in the North-East region of Brazil. It is located on the banks of the Rio São Francisco and the Carinhanha River, which also forms the border of the state of Minas Gerais.

See also
List of municipalities in Bahia

References

Municipalities in Bahia